Thomas James Fleming (July 5, 1927 – July 23, 2017) was an American historian and historical novelist and the author of over forty nonfiction and fiction titles. His work reflects a particular interest on the American Revolution, with titles such as Liberty! The American Revolution And The Future Of America, Duel: Alexander Hamilton, Aaron Burr, and the History of America and Washington's Secret War: The Hidden History of Valley Forge.

Biography
A native of Jersey City, New Jersey, Fleming graduated from St. Peter's Preparatory School in 1945 and from Fordham University in 1950, serving a year in the United States Navy before he started college.

Fleming served as president of the Society of American Historians and the PEN American Center. Fleming also spent ten years as chairman of the New York American Revolution Round Table and was an Honorary Member of the New York State Society of the Cincinnati since 1975. He lived in New York with his wife, Alice, a writer of books for young people.

Fleming published books about various events and figures of the Revolutionary era. He also wrote about other periods of American history, and wrote over a dozen well-received novels set against various historical backgrounds. He said, "I never wanted to be an Irish-American writer, my whole idea was to get across that bridge and be an American writer".

Fleming died at his home in New York City on July 23, 2017, at the age of 90.

Bibliography

Histories

Now We Are Enemies
Beat the Last Drum: The Siege of Yorktown 1781
One Small Candle: The Pilgrims' First Year In America. New York: W. W. Norton & Co., 1963.

The Perils of Peace: America’s Struggle to Survive After Yorktown
The Irish-American Chronicle
The New Dealers’ War: FDR and the War Within World War II
*
Duel: Alexander Hamilton, Aaron Burr and the Future of America
Liberty! The American Revolution

The Man from Monticello: An Intimate Life of Thomas Jefferson
The Man Who Dared the Lightning: A New Look at Benjamin Franklin
Benjamin Franklin: A Life in His Own Words (ed.)
The Forgotten Victory: The Battle for New Jersey–1780
The First Stroke: Lexington, Concord, and the Beginning of the American Revolution
West Point: The Men and Times of the U.S. Military Academy
1776: Year of Illusions
The Intimate Lives of the Founding Fathers
George Washington: The General from Profiles in Leadership (ed. Walter Isaacson)

The Strategy of Victory: How George Washington Won the American Revolution. New York: Da Capo Press, 2017. . OCLC 1008913772

Novels
Liberty Tavern
Dreams of Glory
The Spoils of War
Rulers of the City
A Passionate Girl
Promises to Keep
Remember The Morning
The Wages of Fame

The Secret Trial of Robert E. Lee
The Officers’ Wives
Time and Tide
Over There
Loyalties: A Novel of World War II
All Good Men
The God of Love

References

Sources
Who's Who in America
Contemporary Authors, v. 7–8
Contemporary Literary Criticism, v. 37
B.U. Bridge newspaper, Volume 5, No. 4, 28 September 2001

External links
 Thomas Fleming's home page
 
 The American Revolution Center
 The American Revolution Round Table (New York)
 The Society of American Historians
 
Booknotes interview with Fleming on The New Dealers' War, August 26, 2001.
In Depth interview with Fleming, January 4, 2004
 Fleming's Presentation at the Pritzker Military Museum & Library on June 6, 2013

1927 births
2017 deaths
American military historians
American historical novelists
Historians of the American Revolution
Writers from Jersey City, New Jersey
20th-century American novelists
21st-century American novelists
20th-century American historians
21st-century American historians
American male novelists
20th-century American male writers
21st-century American male writers
Novelists from New Jersey
People from Jersey City, New Jersey
Fordham University alumni
St. Peter's Preparatory School alumni
American male non-fiction writers
United States Navy sailors
Historians from New Jersey